We Are All Demons is a 1969 Danish drama film directed by Henning Carlsen. The film is based on the novel "Klabautermanden" by Aksel Sandemose.  It was entered into the 19th Berlin International Film Festival.

Cast
 Lise Fjeldstad - Inger
 Hans Stormoen - Asbjørn Bauta
 Claus Nissen - Asthor Asbjörnsen
 Allan Edwall - Tor, den syke matrosen
 Peter Lindgren - First Mate
 Gunnar Strømvad - Besetningsmedlem
 Knud Hilding - Crew
 Jørgen Langebæk - Crew
 Erling Dalsborg - The Jew
 Ole Søgaard - Klaus Bornholmeren
 Torben Færch - Yngste lettmatros
 Ove Pedersen - Skipsgutten
 Margit Carlqvist - Nurse
 Flemming Dyjak - Esbjørn
 Ole Larsen - Toldbetjent
 Kim Andersen - Ingers søn Arnor

External links

1969 films
1960s Danish-language films
1969 drama films
Danish black-and-white films
Films directed by Henning Carlsen
Films based on Danish novels
Danish drama films